The Van's RV-3 is a single-seat, single-engine, low-wing kit aircraft sold by Van's Aircraft. Unlike many other aircraft in the RV line, the RV-3 is only available as a tail-wheel equipped aircraft, although it is possible that some may have been completed by builders as nose-wheel versions. The RV-3 is the genesis design for the rest of the RV series, all which strongly resemble the RV-3. The RV-4 was originally developed as a two-seat RV-3.

Development

The architect of the line of Van's aircraft, Richard VanGrunsven, designed the RV-3 in the late 1960s after experience flying the Stits Playboy amateur-built aircraft. The RV-3 started out as an attempt to maintain the Playboy's layout and concept but to improve it in every regard. The RV-3 was designed to have light handling, aerobatic capabilities, fast cruise speeds, and short field STOL capabilities. The RV-3 was also designed from the start for serious travel and as such carries 30 US gallons of fuel, giving it a range of about 600 statute miles. The design horsepower is 100–150, typically using a Lycoming O-235 or Lycoming O-320 powerplant. Some builders have fitted RV-3s with more powerful engines, however.

The RV-3 uses a NACA 23012 airfoil on a constant chord wing. Construction is semi-monocoque of predominantly 2024-T3 aluminum sheet. The wings are built around an aluminum I-beam spar with a lighter rear spar. The aircraft has plain flaps operated by a handle. The main landing gear is attached directly to the welded steel engine mount and consists of tapered, sprung steel rods. Construction time for the RV-3 is reported to be 1300 hours for a first time builder.

The very first RV-3 built by VanGrunsven won "Best Aerodynamic Detailing" at the 1972 EAA Oshkosh Convention. It also won the 1973 AC/EAA Efficiency Contest.

There is an RV-3A model, but its designation does not follow VanGrunsven's normal system, where "A" models are nosewheel equipped versions. An RV-3A is an early RV-3 that has undergone rear spar and wing root upgrades as described in Van's publication CN-1. Due to ongoing structural concerns, the production of RV-3 kits was suspended in 1996. Continued customer demand for the single seat design resulted in VanGrunsven engineering a new wing for the RV-3. Production of kits was restarted a few years later. New aircraft completed since the wing redesign and aircraft that have been retrofitted with the new wing are referred to as an RV-3B.

By February 2023, 305 RV-3s had been completed and flown.

Aircraft on display
EAA AirVenture Museum – RV-3 Prototype N17RV

Specifications (RV-3B)

See also

References

External links

Van's Aircraft RV-3

Homebuilt aircraft
1970s United States civil utility aircraft
Low-wing aircraft
Single-engined tractor aircraft
RV-03
Aircraft first flown in 1971